Conizonia kalashiani is a species of beetle in the family Cerambycidae. It was described by Mikhail Leontievich Danilevsky in 1992. It is known from Georgia.

References

Saperdini
Beetles described in 1992